Pinara divisa, the common pinara, is a species of moth of the family Lasiocampidae. It was first described by Francis Walker in 1855. It is found in the south-east quarter of Australia.

The wingspan is about 40 mm.

The larvae feed on eucalyptus species.

References

Lasiocampidae
Moths of Australia
Moths described in 1855